Red Arrows Sky Force is a Gerstlauer Sky Fly ride at Blackpool Pleasure Beach that opened on 2 May 2015.

History 

After the closure of Bling in 2011 at the amusement park, the site immediately south of The Big One's hill remained empty with the exception of a few potted plants.

Towards the end of the 2014 season, Pleasure Beach announced they had joined forces with the Red Arrows, the Royal Air Force Aerobatic Team, to deliver 'Red Arrows Skyforce' for the 2015 season.

Red Arrows Skyforce was opened by Amanda Thompson (Managing Director of Blackpool Pleasure Beach) on 25 May 2015 and has been in operation ever since.

References

Amusement rides introduced in 2015
Amusement rides manufactured by Gerstlauer
Blackpool Pleasure Beach
Red Arrows